Triston Grant (born February 2, 1984) is a Canadian former professional ice hockey left winger who played 11 games in the National Hockey League for the Philadelphia Flyers and Nashville Predators between 2006 and 2009. The rest of his career, which lasted from 2005 to 2018, was spent in the minor leagues.

Playing career

Grant spent five seasons in the Western Hockey League with the Lethbridge Hurricanes and Vancouver Giants. Drafted 286th overall in the 2004 NHL Entry Draft by the Philadelphia Flyers, Grant has spent most of his career in the American Hockey League. However, he was called up early in the 2006–07 NHL season to the Philadelphia Flyers, and made his NHL debut on October 26, 2006. Between 2005 and 2012, Grant played for the Philadelphia Phantoms, Milwaukee Admirals, Rochester Americans, and the Oklahoma City Barons in the AHL.

Signed on July 9, 2012 by Grand Rapids Griffins for the 2012–13 AHL season, Grant won the Calder Cup with the Griffins in 2013. On July 9, 2013, Grant re-signed with the Griffins for the 2013–14 AHL season.

On July 21, 2014, Grant signed a one-year deal with the Milwaukee Admirals as a free agent. During the 2014–15 season, Grant posted career highs in goals (13), assists (13), and points (26). On July 6, 2015, Grant returned to the Grand Rapids Griffins for a second stint, signing a one-year contract.

Career statistics

References

External links
 

1984 births
Living people
Binghamton Senators players
Canadian ice hockey left wingers
Grand Rapids Griffins players
Ice hockey people from Manitoba
Lethbridge Hurricanes players
Milwaukee Admirals players
Nashville Predators players
Neepawa Natives players
Oklahoma City Barons players
People from Neepawa, Manitoba
Philadelphia Flyers draft picks
Philadelphia Flyers players
Philadelphia Phantoms players
Quad City Mallards (ECHL) players
Rapid City Rush players
Rochester Americans players
Vancouver Giants players
Wichita Thunder players